Weldon Dean Parks (born December 6, 1946) is an American session guitarist and record producer from Fort Worth, Texas.

Albums
Parks was member of the North Texas State One O'clock Lab Band before moving to Los Angeles to work with Sonny and Cher in 1970. In 1980, he was a founding member of the Christian Jazz Fusion band Koinonia. Parks is best known for his many contributions to albums by Steely Dan, Michael Jackson, and Bread. Notably, he played guitar on Steely Dan's Royal Scam track, "Haitian Divorce". Parks is also a long time collaborator on David Foster albums, such as Shadows by Gordon Lightfoot.

Parks features on Cat Beach's albums Letting Go and Love Me Out Loud. In 2008, Parks participated in the production of the album Psalngs, the debut release of Canadian musician John Lefebvre.

Dean Parks is very prominently featured on Viktor Krauss' album II (2007), where he plays a plethora of other stringed instruments in addition to electric and acoustic guitars.

Tours

During the late 1970s, Parks teamed up with Bread for their "Lost Without Your Love" reunion tour, taking on the responsibilities of lead guitarist. Following the departure of founding member Jimmy Griffin, Parks then became the 'unofficial' fourth member for the duration of the 1977/78 tours, including the visit to England to record a BBC TV special.

He continued the role when Bread's co-founder, David Gates, put together his own solo touring band shortly afterwards. In the spring of 2005 he joined David Crosby and Graham Nash on their European tour, as well as their U.S. tours in fall 2007, fall 2008, and spring 2011. In April 2017 Parks joined James Taylor's band while Taylor recovered from a broken finger.

Movies
Parks has played guitar for film scores such as Care Bears Movie II: A New Generation (with Carol Parks), Bowfinger, My Big Fat Greek Wedding, The Big Bounce, Days of Thunder, Dying Young, August Rush, Dreamer: Inspired by a True Story and Rosewood (with Tommy Morgan and John Williams).

Personal life
He was married to fellow musician Carol Parks.

Discography
With America
 1980 Alibi
 1982 View from the Ground
 1984 Perspective

With Bobby Bland
 1969 Spotlighting the Man
 1973 His California Album
 1974 Dreamer

With Cher/Sonny & Cher
 1973 Sonny & Cher Live, Sonny & Cher
 1973 Bittersweet White Light, Cher
 1973 Mama Was a Rock and Roll Singer, Papa Used to Write All Her Songs, Sonny & Cher

With Chris Botti
 1999 Slowing Down the World
 2003 A Thousand Kisses Deep
 2004 When I Fall in Love
 2005 To Love Again: The Duets
 2007 Italia

With Michael Bublé
 2003 Michael Bublé
 2005 It's Time
 2007 Call Me Irresponsible
 2009 Crazy Love
 2011 Christmas
 2018 Love

With T Bone Burnett
 1972 The B-52 Band & the Fabulous Skylarks
 1992 The Criminal Under My Own Hat

With Joe Cocker
 1984 Civilized Man
 1996 Organic
 1997 Across from Midnight
 2004 Heart & Soul

With Andraé Crouch
 1975 Take Me Back
 1979 I'll Be Thinking of You
 1981 Don't Give Up

With Rita Coolidge
 1974 Fall into Spring
 1975 It's Only Love
 1979 Satisfied
 1981 Heartbreak Radio
 1996 Out of the Blues

With The Crusaders
 1976 Free as the Wind
 1978 Images
 1980 Rhapsody and Blues
 1980 Standing Tall
 1984 Ghetto Blaster
 1986 The Good and the Bad Times
 2003 Rural Renewal

With Julia Fordham
 1991 Swept
 2002 Concrete Love
 2004 That's Life
 2005 That's Live

With Kenny Loggins
 1977 Celebrate Me Home
 1991 Leap of Faith
 1994 Return to Pooh Corner
 1997 The Unimaginable Life
 2000 More Songs from Pooh Corner

With Lyle Lovett
 1992 Joshua Judges Ruth
 1996 The Road to Ensenada
 1998 Step Inside This House
 2003 My Baby Don't Tolerate
 2003 Smile
 2007 It's Not Big It's Large
 2009 Natural Forces
 2012 Release Me

With The Manhattan Transfer
 1979 Extensions
 1981 Mecca for Moderns
 1995 Tonin'

With Aaron Neville
 1991 Warm Your Heart
 1993 The Grand Tour
 1993 Aaron Neville's Soulfoul Christmas
 1995 The Tattooed Heart
 1997 ...To Make Me Who I Am
 2000 Devotion
 2003 Believe
 2005 Gospel Roots

With Madeleine Peyroux
 2004 Careless Love
 2006 Half the Perfect World
 2009 Bare Bones
 2013 The Blue Room

With Rebecca Pidgeon
 2005 Tough on Crime
 2008 Behind the Velvet Curtain: Songs from the Motion Picture Redbelt
 2012 Slingshot

With Joe Sample
 1978 Rainbow Seeker
 1979 Carmel
 1980 Voices in the Rain
 1982 The Hunter
 1983 Roles
 1985 Oasis
 1995 Old Places Old Faces
 1997 Sample This
 2002 The Pecan Tree

With Steely Dan
 1974 Pretzel Logic
 1975 Katy Lied
 1976 The Royal Scam
 1977 Aja
 2000 Two Against Nature

With others
 1971 Helen Reddy, Helen Reddy
 1972 L.A. Reggae, Johnny Rivers
 1973 Let's Get It On, Marvin Gaye
 1973 Lulu, Lulu
 1973 Piano Man, Billy Joel
 1973 Blue Suede Shoes, Johnny Rivers
 1973 Innervisions, Stevie Wonder
 1973 Eddie Kendricks, Eddie Kendricks
 1973 Angel Clare, Art Garfunkel
 1974 Martha Reeves, Martha Reeves
 1974 Boogie Down!, Eddie Kendricks
 1974 Reunion: The Songs of Jimmy Webb, Glen Campbell
 1974 Wrap Around Joy, Carole King
 1975 Sedaka's Back, Neil Sedaka
 1975 New Lovers and Old Friends, Johnny Rivers
 1975 Nigel Olsson, Nigel Olsson
 1975 Diamonds & Rust, Joan Baez
 1975 Rhinestone Cowboy, Glen Campbell
 1975 Adventures in Paradise, Minnie Riperton
 1975 Kim Carnes, Kim Carnes
 1975 I've Got the Music in Me, Thelma Houston
 1976 Songs in the Key of Life, Stevie Wonder
 1976 Photograph, Melanie
 1976 Streetheart, Dion DiMucci
 1976 Wild Night, Johnny Rivers
 1976 Music, Music, Helen Reddy
 1976 Bloodline, Glen Campbell
 1976 Steppin' Out, Neil Sedaka
 1976 Everything Must Change, Randy Crawford
 1976 Endless Flight, Leo Sayer
 1976 Gulf Winds, Joan Baez
 1976 Dee Dee Bridgewater, Dee Dee Bridgewater
 1976 The Painter, Paul Anka
 1977 Here You Come Again, Dolly Parton
 1977 El Mirage, Jimmy Webb
 1977 Outside Help, Johnny Rivers
 1977 Blowin' Away, Joan Baez
 1978 Heartbreaker, Dolly Parton
 1978 Leo Sayer, Leo Sayer
 1978 Night Flight, Yvonne Elliman
 1978 This Night Won't Last Forever, Bill LaBounty
 1978 Midnight Believer, B.B. King
 1979 Open Your Eyes, Maria Muldaur
 1979 Wet, Barbra Streisand
 1979 Hard Times for Lovers, Judy Collins
 1979 Take It Home, B.B. King
 1980 Inherit the Wind, Wilton Felder
 1980 This Time, Al Jarreau
 1980 Now We May Begin, Randy Crawford
 1980 Red Cab to Manhattan, Stephen Bishop
 1980 Somethin' 'Bout You Baby I Like, Glen Campbell
 1980 In the Pocket, Neil Sedaka
 1981 Power of Love, Arlo Guthrie
 1981 Secret Combination, Randy Crawford
 1981 I'll Be There, Gail Davies
 1981 Pirates, Rickie Lee Jones
 1981 If I Should Love Again, Barry Manilow
 1981 The Right Place, Gary Wright
 1981 Restless Eyes, Janis Ian
 1981 Songs of the Beatles, Sarah Vaughan
 1981 Scissors Cut, Art Garfunkel
 1981 Love Life, Brenda Russell
 1981 Breakin Away, Al Jarreau
 1982 Windsong, Randy Crawford
 1982 Friends in Love, Dionne Warwick
 1982 Heartlight, Neil Diamond
 1982 Daylight Again, Crosby, Stills & Nash
 1982 If That's What It Takes, Michael McDonald
 1982 Hey Ricky, Melissa Manchester
 1982 Givin' Herself Away, Gail Davies
 1982 Angel Heart, Jimmy Webb
 1982 Bill LaBounty, Bill LaBounty
 1982 Shadows, Gordon Lightfoot
 1982 The Nightfly, Donald Fagen
 1982 Thriller, Michael Jackson
 1983 Hearts and Bones, Paul Simon
 1983 Hello Big Man, Carly Simon
 1983 Salute, Gordon Lightfoot
 1983 What a Feelin', Irene Cara
 1983 Seventh Wave, Melanie
 1983 Not a Through Street, Johnny Rivers
 1983 Girl at Her Volcano, Rickie Lee Jones
 1983 Surrender, Debby Boone
 1983 The Wild Heart, Stevie Nicks
 1983 Emergency, Melissa Manchester
 1983 A Christmas Album, Amy Grant
 1983 Two Eyes, Brenda Russell
 1983 Trouble in Paradise, Randy Newman
 1984 Straight Ahead, Amy Grant
 1984 The Magazine, Rickie Lee Jones
 1985 Stay Tuned, Chet Atkins
 1985 Dreamland Express, John Denver
 1985 Without Your Love, Dionne Warwick
 1985 Real Love, Dolly Parton
 1985 Nobody Wants to Be Alone, Crystal Gayle
 1985 Dangerous, Natalie Cole
 1986 One World, John Denver
 1986 Rapture, Anita Baker
 1986 Street Language, Rodney Crowell
 1986 Nine Lives, Bonnie Raitt
 1986 The Bridge, Billy Joel
 1987 I Prefer the Moonlight, Kenny Rogers
 1987 Famous Blue Raincoat, Jennifer Warnes
 1987 Maria Vidal, Maria Vidal
 1988 Brian Wilson, Brian Wilson
 1988 The Best Years of Our Lives, Neil Diamond
 1988 Nothing but the Truth, Ruben Blades
 1988 Land of Dreams, Randy Newman
 1988 Twice the Love, George Benson
 1988 Nobody's Angel, Crystal Gayle
 1989 On Solid Ground, Larry Carlton
 1989 Something Inside So Strong, Kenny Rogers
 1989 Somebody Loves You, Paul Anka
 1989 Ain't Gonna Cry, Juice Newton
 1989 Good to Be Back, Natalie Cole
 1989 Barry Manilow, Barry Manilow
 1989 No Holdin' Back, Randy Travis
 1989 Home for Christmas, Debby Boone
 1989 Here I Am... Yes, It's Me, Nikka Costa
 1989 Vonda Shepard, Vonda Shepard
 1989 Bowling in Paris, Stephen Bishop
 1989 Flying Cowboys, Rickie Lee Jones
 1989 Cry Like a Rainstorm, Howl Like the Wind, Aaron Neville, Linda Ronstadt
 1989 O Tempo e o Vento, Roberto Carlos
 1990 Some People's Lives, Bette Midler
 1990 Heroes & Friends, Randy Travis
 1990 Beth Nielsen Chapman, Beth Nielsen Chapman
 1990 Ivory, Teena Marie
 1990 If There Was a Way, Dwight Yoakam
 1990 Blue Pacific, Michael Franks
 1990 Kiss Me with the Wind, Brenda Russell
 1991 What You See Is What You Sweat, Aretha Franklin
 1991 Pure Schuur, Diane Schuur
 1991 Dance of Love, Dan Hill
 1991 Showstoppers, Barry Manilow
 1991 Christmas, Stephanie Mills
 1991 The Fire Inside, Bob Seger
 1991 Can You Stop the Rain, Peabo Bryson
 1991 All I Can Be, Collin Raye
 1992 The Future, Leonard Cohen
 1992 King of Hearts, Roy Orbison
 1992 Timeless: The Classics, Michael Bolton
 1992 The Christmas Album, Neil Diamond
 1992 In the Running, Howard Jones
 1992 Something Real, Stephanie Mills
 1993 Suspending Disbelief, Jimmy Webb
 1993 Back to Broadway, Barbra Streisand
 1993 This Time, Dwight Yoakam
 1993 Let There Be Peace on Earth, Vince Gill
 1993 The Crossing, Paul Young
 1993 Up on the Roof: Songs from the Brill Building, Neil Diamond
 1993 I'll Always Be There, Roch Voisine
 1993 Friends Can Be Lovers, Dionne Warwick
 1993 Thousand Roads, David Crosby
 1993 Traffic from Paradise, Rickie Lee Jones
 1993 The Colour of My Love, Céline Dion
 1993 I'm Alive, Jackson Browne
 1993 Duets, Elton John
 1993 Blink of an Eye, Michael McDonald
 1994 11 Tracks of Whack, Walter Becker
 1994 Rhythm of Love, Anita Baker
 1994 Passion Play, Teena Marie
 1994 Jamie Walters, Jamie Walters
 1995 Bette of Roses, Bette Midler
 1995 Gone, Dwight Yoakam
 1995 That's Me in the Bar, A. J. Croce
 1995 Time Was, Curtis Stigers
 1995 Delilah Blue, Joshua Kadison
 1995 Kissing Rain, Roch Voisine
 1995 Feels Like Home, Linda Ronstadt
 1996 Treasures, Dolly Parton
 1996 Louder Than Words, Lionel Richie
 1996 Mandy Barnett, Mandy Barnett
 1996 Secrets, Toni Braxton
 1996 Full Circle, Randy Travis
 1996 Ten Easy Pieces, Jimmy Webb
 1996 Fade into Light, Boz Scaggs
 1997 Higher Ground, Barbra Streisand
 1997 Under the Covers, Dwight Yoakam
 1997 Deuces Wild, B.B. King
 1997 Songs from a Parent to a Child, Art Garfunkel
 1997 Deborah, Debbie Gibson
 1997 Evolution, Martina McBride
 1997 Dark Dear Heart, Holly Cole
 1997 Open Road, Gary Barlow
 1997 Let's Talk About Love, Céline Dion
 1997 All That Matters, Michael Bolton
 1997 Nothin' But the Taillights, Clint Black
 1997 Three Chords and the Truth, Sara Evans
 1997 Talk on Corners, The Corrs
 1998 Back with a Heart, Olivia Newton-John
 1998 A Long Way Home, Dwight Yoakam
 1998 Painted From Memory, Elvis Costello, Burt Bacharach
 1998 Bathhouse Betty, Bette Midler
 1998 Jennifer Paige, Jennifer Paige
 1998 We Ran, Linda Ronstadt
 1998 Manilow Sings Sinatra, Barry Manilow
 1998 Time, Lionel Richie
 1999 D'lectrified, Clint Black
 1999 Tuesday's Child, Amanda Marshall
 1999 Music Is My Life, Diane Schuur
 1999 A Love Like Ours, Barbra Streisand
 1999 Smokin' Section, Tom Scott
 2000 Inside Job, Don Henley
 2000 Bette, Bette Midler
 2000 Friends for Schuur, Diane Schuur
 2000 Soul & Inspiration, Barry Mann
 2000 The Heat, Toni Braxton
 2000 A Merry Little Christmas, Linda Ronstadt
 2000 The Dreams of Johnny Mercer, Monica Mancini
 2001 Josh Groban, Josh Groban
 2001 Love Makes the World, Carole King
 2001 Mandy Moore, Mandy Moore
 2001 Renaissance, Lionel Richie
 2001 Christmas Memories, Barbra Streisand
 2001 The Well, Jennifer Warnes
 2002 No Stranger to Shame, Uncle Kracker
 2002 Songs for Survivors, Graham Nash
 2002 Cry, Faith Hill
 2002 Christmas Is Almost Here, Carly Simon
 2002 Spirit World, Stephen Bruton
 2002 Together, Lulu
 2003 Closer, Josh Groban
 2003 Believe, Aaron Neville
 2003 The Movie Album, Barbra Streisand
 2003 Bette Midler Sings the Rosemary Clooney Songbook, Bette Midler
 2003 Next Big Thing, Vince Gill
 2003 Christmas Is Almost Here Again, Carly Simon
 2003 As Time Goes By: The Great American Songbook, Volume II, Rod Stewart
 2004 Lazy Afternoon, Regina Belle
 2004 Melancolista, Adam Cohen
 2004 Spend My Time, Clint Black
 2004 Deja Vu All Over Again, John Fogerty
 2004 Miracle, Céline Dion
 2004 Nightcap, Marilyn Scott
 2004 Between Here and Gone, Mary Chapin Carpenter
 2004 Christmas with You, Clint Black
 2004 Amore Musica, Russell Watson
 2004 Lucky, Melissa Etheridge
 2004 Blue Skies, Diana DeGarmo
 2004 Renee Olstead, Renee Olstead
 2004 What a Wonderful World, LeAnn Rimes
 2005 B.B. King & Friends: 80, B.B. King
 2005 Rock Swings, Paul Anka
 2005 Libra, Toni Braxton
 2005 Rock of Ages... Hymns and Faith, Amy Grant
 2005 Twilight of the Renegades, Jimmy Webb
 2006 Awake, Josh Groban
 2006 Still the Same... Great Rock Classics of Our Time, Rod Stewart
 2006 I Love You, Diana Ross
 2006 Feeling Good, Randy Crawford, Joe Sample
 2006 Cool Yule, Bette Midler
 2006 Givin' It Up, Al Jarreau, George Benson
 2006 Jazz Academy, Michael Brecker
 2006 Oceana, Till Brönner
 2007 Some Enchanted Evening, Art Garfunkel
 2007 That's Life, Russell Watson
 2007 The Love Songs, Clint Black
 2007 Courage, Paula Cole
 2007 Noël, Josh Groban
 2007 The Calling, Mary Chapin Carpenter
 2007 Home at Last, Billy Ray Cyrus
 2007 East of Angel Town, Peter Cincotti
 2007 II, Viktor Krauss
 2007 River: The Joni Letters, Herbie Hancock
 2008 Circus Money, Walter Becker
 2008 Like a Fire, Solomon Burke
 2008 Our Bright Future, Tracy Chapman
 2008 Soul, Seal
 2008 Just a Little Lovin', Shelby Lynne
 2009 At Last, Lynda Carter
 2009 Believe, Katherine Jenkins
 2009 Bounce Back, the 3DVB's/Creed Bratton
 2009 I've Loved These Days, Monica Mancini
 2009 If on a Winter's Night, Sting
 2009 Shadows on the Moon, Johnny Rivers
 2009 Skylark, Renee Olstead
 2009 Soulbook, Rod Stewart
 2009 Speak Love, Courtney Fortune
 2010 Bring Me to Life, Katherine Jenkins
 2010 The Imagine Project, Herbie Hancock
 2010 Fly Me to the Moon... The Great American Songbook Volume V Rod Stewart
 2010 The Secret Sisters, the Secret Sisters
 2011 Umbigobunker!?, Jay Vaquer
 2011 A Holiday Carole, Carole King
 2011 When Ronan Met Burt, Ronan Keating, Burt Bacharach
 2011 What Matters Most, Barbra Streisand
 2011 Sound Advice, Patti Austin
 2012 Merry Christmas, Baby, Rod Stewart
 2012 Let's Go Out Tonight, Curtis Stigers
 2012 Songs of December, Paul Anka
 2012 The Gypsy Queens, The Gypsy Queens
 2013 Spitfire, LeAnn Rimes
 2013 Wrote a Song for Everyone, John Fogerty
 2013 Trust, Alfie Boe
 2014 Partners, Barbra Streisand
 2014 Tracks of My Years, Bryan Adams
 2014 Map to the Treasure: Reimagining Laura Nyro, Billy Childs
 2015 Currency of Man, Melody Gardot
 2015 Freedom & Surrender, Lizz Wright
 2015 No Pier Pressure, Brian Wilson
 2015 On Purpose, Clint Black
 2015 Tenderness, J. D. Souther
 2015 Wallflower, Diana Krall
 2016 Down to My Last Bad Habit, Vince Gill
 2016 Fire on the Floor, Beth Hart
 2016 Summertime: Willie Nelson Sings Gershwin, Willie Nelson
 2016 Short Stories, Dominick Farinacci
 2016 This Girl's in Love, Rumer
 2016 Fallen Angels, Bob Dylan
 2016 Encore: Movie Partners Sing Broadway, Barbra Streisand
 2016 Down to My Last Bad Habit, Vince Gill
 2016 Encore un soir, Céline Dion
 2017 Sky Trails, David Crosby
 2017 Seal, Seal
 2017 Triplicate, Bob Dylan
 2020 Out of Sane, Clint Black
 2020 Music... The Air That I Breathe, Cliff Richard

See also
 Katy Lied

References

External links
Official site

American film score composers
American rock guitarists
American male guitarists
Guitarists from California
American session musicians
People from Fort Worth, Texas
University of North Texas College of Music alumni
Living people
American male film score composers
Koinonia (band) members
1946 births
Lyle Lovett and His Large Band members
Bloodrock members